The 2022 Pittsburgh Panthers men's soccer team represented the University of Pittsburgh during the 2022 NCAA Division I men's soccer season.  The Panthers were led by head coach Jay Vidovich, in his seventh season.  They played home games at Ambrose Urbanic Field.  This was the team's 69th season playing organized men's college soccer and their 10th playing in the Atlantic Coast Conference.

The Panthers finished the season 12–5–5 overall and 3–2–3 in ACC play to finish in third place in the Coastal Division. As the sixth overall seed in the ACC Tournament,  they defeated eleventh seed NC State in the first round before losing to third seed Virginia in the Quarterfinals. They received an at-large bid to the NCAA Tournament and were an unseeded team. There they lost to Indiana to end their season.

Background 

The Panthers finished the season 13–5–2 overall and 5–2–1 in ACC play to finish in a tie for first place in the Coastal Division.  They won a tiebreaker with Duke to be awarded the first overall seed in the ACC Tournament.  They earned a bye into the Quarterfinals where they defeated Virginia Tech before losing to eventual champions Notre Dame in the Semifinals.  They received an at-large bid to the NCAA Tournament and were awarded the fifth overall seed.  After a First Round bye, they defeated Northern Illinois in the Second Round and Hofstra in the Third Round before losing to Notre Dame on penalties to end their season.

Player movement

Players leaving

Players arriving

Incoming Transfers

Recruiting Class

Squad

Roster

Team management

Source:

Schedule 

Source:

|-
!colspan=6 style=""| Exhibition

|-
!colspan=6 style=""| Regular season
|-

|-
!colspan=6 style=""| ACC Tournament

|-
!colspan=6 style=""| NCAA Tournament

Awards and honors

Rankings

2023 MLS Super draft

Source:

References 

2022
2022 Atlantic Coast Conference men's soccer season
American men's college soccer teams 2022 season
2022 in sports in Pennsylvania
2022 NCAA Division I Men's Soccer Tournament participants
2022